Porras (which means "clubs" in Spanish) and may refer to Sporran. Porran Old Scottish Gaelic.

People
 Baltazar Enrique Porras Cardozo (born 1944), Venezuelan Catholic cardinal 
 Belisario Porras Barahona, Panamanian journalist and politician
 Emanuel De Porras, Argentinian footballer
 Gabriel Porras, Mexican actor
 Gonzalo Martín De Porras, Argentinian footballer
 Jerry I. Porras, American professor and analyst
 José Porras, Costa Rican footballer
 José Joaquín Mora Porras, Costa Rican 19th century politician
 Juan Rafael Mora Porras, President of Costa Rica from 1849 to 1859. 
 Lizardo Alzamora Porras, Peruvian politician
 Luis Gallo Porras, Peruvian politician
 Raúl Porras Barrenechea, Peruvian historian
 Rick Porras, American film producer

Places
Porras is also Finnish for staircase.

Porras, Tammela